Professor Alan J Sinclair (born 1952) is a clinical scientist and diabetes specialist from Newcastle-under-Lyme, England.

Early life
He was born in Newcastle-under-Lyme and was a pupil at Newcastle High School where he played rugby and cricket for the school, which he left in 1972

Education
Sinclair was a graduate of the University of London where he completed his Bachelor of Science degree with first class honours in biochemistry at St Bartholomew's Hospital Medical College in 1976 and then obtained MBBS medical degrees at the same institution in 1979. He was later awarded his doctorate (MD) in London in 1992 in and his Master of Medicine degree in 1993 at the University of Sydney, Australia. He became Fellow of the Royal College of Physicians in 1995.

Career and research
Sinclair has held full/honorary clinical professorial appointments in Birmingham,  Warwick, Bedfordshire and Aston. He established the Institute of Diabetes for Older People (IDOP) in 1998 in Bedfordshire, and in 2014, set up Diabetes Frail Ltd. His key research has centred on diabetes in older people, frailty, and sarcopaenia.

In 2001, Sinclair became Chair of the European Diabetes Working Party for Older People (EDWPOP), which later published the first European guidelines in diabetes care for older people. Between 2010 and 2013, Sinclair was National Clinical Lead for Diabetes in Older People at NHS Diabetes (Department of Health).

Sinclair launched the first-ever, England-wide Care Home Diabetes Audit in 2012 in gain evidence in order to improve the quality of care for people with diabetes living in care homes. The results were published in 2014.

In 2013, he was awarded the International Association of Gerontology and Geriatrics (IAGG) Presidential Medal for services to diabetes and older people. In 2014, he co-chaired the International Diabetes Federation (IDF) Working Party that later produced the first international diabetes guidance in those who are frail or demented.

He was appointed to the WHO Expert Group on Frailty in 2015 and later provided peer review support to a World Report on Ageing and Health by the WHO.

Also in 2015, Sinclair contributed to Care Quality Commission (CQC) guidelines to help improve the quality of care for people with diabetes living in care homes.

In autumn 2018, Sinclair was named 11th in a list of the UK's leading experts into diabetes based on the impact of research. The list is put together by Expertscape, a website that enables people to find the medical professionals and institutions who have the greatest knowledge about a particular medical problem.

References

External links
 International Federation of Ageing (IFA) expert profile for Professor Alan Sinclair

1952 births
People from Newcastle-under-Lyme
English scientists
Living people
People educated at Newcastle-under-Lyme School